The women's 4 × 100 metre freestyle relay was a swimming event held as part of the swimming at the 1920 Summer Olympics programme. It was the second appearance of the event.

A total of twelve swimmers, representing three teams from three nations, competed in the event, which was held on Sunday, August 29, 1920. The United States women, who had already swept all six medals in the 100 metre and 300 metre event, won easily. Ethelda Bleibtrey won her third gold medal.

Records

These were the standing world and Olympic records (in minutes) prior to the 1920 Summer Olympics.

The United States set a new world record.

Results

Final

References

 
 

Swimming at the 1920 Summer Olympics
1920 in women's swimming
Swim